Girsang Sipangan Bolon is a subdistrict (kecamatan) in Simalungun Regency, North Sumatra, Indonesia. The subdistrict lies on the southwestern side of the regency, and touches the east coast of Lake Toba. The village of Parapat, the main eastern link to Samosir Island, is located within this subdistrict.

Demographics 
According to a 2016 census, the subdistrict has a population of 14,886. The same census points out the population density of the subdistrict at 115 persons/km2, which is the sixth lowest in the regency.

References 

Populated places in North Sumatra